Acer campbellii, commonly known as Campbell's maple or Himalayan maple, is a species of maple tree indigenous to mixed forests at altitudes of  in Bhutan, northern India, Myanmar, Nepal, and Vietnam, as well as southern Sichuan, southern Xizang, and northwest Yunnan in China.

References

campbellii
Flora of China
Flora of the Indian subcontinent
Flora of Myanmar
Flora of Vietnam